Little Mulgrave is a locality in the Cairns Region, Queensland, Australia.

Geography 
The western part of the locality is the valley of the Little Mulgrave River and the eastern part of the locality is the valley of the Mulgrave River. The Gillies Range Road runs through the locality connecting Gordonvale and the lower localities in the Cairns Region with the Atherton Tableland. The developed areas are mainly around the rivers as the ground rises sharply into the Great Dividing Range. The developed land is used for farming, both cropping (including sugarcane) and grazing. There is a cane tramway through the locality to deliver the harvested sugarcane to the Mulgrave Sugar Mill. The Cairns-Mulgrave Tramway operated from 1897 to 1911, when it was integrated into the Queensland Rail.

History
Little Mulgrave State School No 356 opened on 26-July-26 and closed on 21-February-64.

References

External links 

Cairns Region
Localities in Queensland